The MacBook is a brand of Mac notebook computers designed and marketed by Apple Inc. that use Apple's macOS operating system since 2006. It replaced the PowerBook and iBook brands during the Mac transition to Intel processors, announced in 2005. The current lineup consists of the MacBook Air (2008–present) and the MacBook Pro (2006–present). Two different lines simply named "MacBook" existed from 2006 to 2012 and 2015 to 2019. The MacBook brand was the "world's top-selling line of premium laptops" .

Overview 
The MacBook family was initially housed in designs similar to the iBook and PowerBook lines which preceded them, now making use of a unibody aluminum construction first introduced with the MacBook Air. This new construction also has a black plastic keyboard that was first used on the MacBook Air, which itself was inspired by the sunken keyboard of the original polycarbonate MacBooks. The now standardized keyboard brings congruity to the MacBook line, with black keys on a metallic aluminum body.

The lids of the MacBook family are held closed by a magnet with no mechanical latch, a design element first introduced with the polycarbonate MacBook. The Memory, drives, and batteries were accessible in the old MacBook lineup, though the newest compact lineup solders or glues all such components in place. All of the current MacBooks feature backlit keyboards.

The MacBook was discontinued from February 2012 until March 2015, when a new model featuring an ultraportable design and an all-metal enclosure was introduced. It was again discontinued in July 2019 following a price reduction of the 3rd generation MacBook Air and discontinuation of the 2nd generation model.

Models named "MacBook"

MacBook (2006–2012) 

As part of the Mac transition to Intel processors, Apple released a 13-inch laptop simply named "MacBook", as a successor to the PowerPC-based iBook series of laptops. During its existence, it was the most affordable Mac, serving as an entry-level laptop that was less expensive than the rest of the Mac laptop lineup (the MacBook Pro portable workstation, and later the MacBook Air ultra-portable). It was aimed at the consumer and education markets. Successive revisions of the MacBook were sold to consumers between May 2006 and July 2011, by which time it been superseded by the MacBook Air which had a lower entry price. Apple continued to sell the MacBook to educational institutions until February 2012.

During its existence, it was the best-selling Mac in Apple's history. For five months in 2008, it was the best-selling laptop of any brand in US retail stores.  Collectively, the MacBook brand was the "world's top-selling line of premium laptops."

There have been three separate designs of this MacBook. The original design used a combination of polycarbonate and fiberglass casing which was modeled after the iBook G4. The second design, introduced in October 2008 alongside the 15-inch MacBook Pro, shared the latter's unibody aluminium casing, but lacked a FireWire port. A third design, introduced in late 2009, retained a similar unibody construction but changed back to white polycarbonate.

12-inch MacBook (2015–2019) 

In 2015, Apple introduced the 12-inch MacBook (also called the Retina MacBook, officially marketed as the new MacBook), which sat between the MacBook Air and MacBook Pro in Apple's laptop lineup. It was more compact than any other notebook in the MacBook family at the time and included a Retina display, fanless design, a Butterfly keyboard with lower key travel. It only had a single USB-C port, used for both power and data, as well as a 3.5mm headphone jack. It was released in 2015, revised in 2017, and discontinued in July 2019, a year after the release of the MacBook Air with Retina display.

MacBook family

MacBook Air 

The MacBook Air is Apple's least expensive notebook computer. While the 1st generation was released as a premium ultraportable positioned above the 2006 – 2012 MacBook, lowered prices on subsequent iterations and the discontinuation of that MacBook has made it serve as the entry-level Mac portable. The 2010 to 2017 base model came with a 13-inch screen and was Apple's thinnest notebook computer until the introduction of the MacBook in March 2015. This MacBook Air model features two USB Type-A 3.0 ports and a Thunderbolt 2 port, as well as an SDXC card slot (only on the 13inch model). This model of MacBook Air did not have a Retina Display. A MacBook Air model with an 11-inch screen was available from October 2010 to October 2016. In 2017, the MacBook Air received a small refresh, with the processor speed increased to 1.8 GHz.

On October 30, 2018, the MacBook Air underwent a major design change, dropping the USB Type-A ports, MagSafe, and the SD card slot in favor of two USB-C/Thunderbolt 3 ports and a headphone jack. It was updated with a Retina display and Intel Y-series Amber Lake i5 CPUs, as well as a Force Touch trackpad, a third-generation butterfly mechanism keyboard, and the Touch ID sensor found in the fourth-generation MacBook Pro, but without the Touch Bar. The base price was also raised, although the base configuration of the 2017 model was retained until July 9, 2019, when it was discontinued along with the Retina MacBook. The base price of this model was also dropped to $1099 ($999 for students) on the same day.

On November 10, 2020, Apple announced that the MacBook Air would use the new Apple M1 system on a chip. The M1 Air does not have a fan, ensuring silent operation, but limiting the M1 chip speed in sustained operations. Performance was claimed to be higher than most current Intel laptops.

On June 6, 2022, at WWDC 2022, Apple announced a new MacBook Air based on the Apple M2 system on a chip. It incorporates several design elements from the fifth-generation MacBook Pro models, such as a flat, slab-shaped design, full-sized function keys, and a Liquid Retina display with rounded corners and a notch for a 1080p webcam, but retains the previous generation's fanless design. It includes two combination Thunderbolt 3/USB 4 ports and adds MagSafe charging.

MacBook Pro 

The MacBook Pro is Apple's higher-end notebook available in 13-inch, 15-inch, and 16-inch configurations. The current generation 13-inch MacBook Pro was introduced in October 2018. It features a touch-sensitive OLED display strip located in place of the function keys, a Touch ID sensor integrated with the power button, and four USB-C ports that also serve as Thunderbolt 3 ports. The 13-inch model was also available in a less expensive configuration with conventional function keys and only two USB-C/Thunderbolt 3 ports, but since July 2019, the base MacBook Pro model has the Touch Bar as well as quad-core processors, similar to the higher-end models, although it still has only two USB-C / Thunderbolt 3 ports. The May 4, 2020 refresh adopts many of the upgrades seen in the 16" 2019 MacBook Pro, including the scissor mechanism keyboard ("Magic Keyboard") and a physical Escape button.

On November 13, 2019, Apple released the 16-inch MacBook Pro, replacing the 15-inch model of the previous generation, and replacing the butterfly keyboard with a scissor mechanism keyboard (dubbed the Magic Keyboard by Apple), reverting to the old "inverted-T" arrow key layout, replacing the virtual Escape key on the Touch Bar with a physical key, and replacing the AMD Polaris and Vega graphics from the 15-inch model with options from AMD's Navi graphics architecture, as well as reengineering the speakers, microphone array, and the thermal system compared to the 15-inch; the latter had thermal limitations in the 15-inch model due to its design. In addition, the 16-inch is available with up to 64 GB of DDR4 2667 MHz RAM and up to 8 TB of SSD storage. It also has a 100 Wh battery; this is the largest battery that can be easily carried onto a commercial airliner under U.S. Transportation Security Administration rules.

On November 10, 2020, Apple announced a new model of the MacBook Pro incorporating the new Apple M1 system on a chip. It has a fan, allowing sustained operation of the M1 chip at its full performance level, which is claimed to match or exceed that of Intel versions. Unlike Intel Pro models, the M1 version only comes with a 13-inch screen, has only two Thunderbolt ports and has a maximum of 16 GB random access memory (RAM).

On October 18, 2021, Apple announced new 14-inch and 16-inch MacBook Pro models during an online event. They are based on the M1 Pro and M1 Max, Apple's first professional-focused ARM-based systems on a chip. This release addressed many criticisms of the previous generation by reintroducing hard function keys in place of the Touch Bar, an HDMI 2.0 port, a SDXC reader and MagSafe charging. Other additions include a Liquid Retina XDR display with thinner bezels and an iPhone-like notch, ProMotion supporting 120Hz variable refresh rate, a 1080p webcam, Wi-Fi 6, 3 Thunderbolt 4 ports, a six-speaker sound system supporting Dolby Atmos, and support for a third 6K display on M1 Max models. The 16-inch version is bundled with a 140W GaN power supply that supports USB-C Power Delivery 3.1, though only MagSafe supports full-speed charging as the machine's USB-C ports are limited to 100W.

On June 6, 2022, Apple announced an updated 13-inch MacBook Pro based on the Apple M2 system on a chip. It is housed in the same chassis as the previous M1 MacBook Pro. 

On January 17, 2023, Apple announced updated 14-inch and 16-inch MacBook Pro models based on the M2 Pro and M2 Max chips. The updated models also include Bluetooth 5.3 and Wi-Fi 6E connectivity, HDMI 2.1, longer battery life, and up to 96GB of memory with M2 Max models.

Comparisons

Timeline

See also 
MacBook Air
MacBook Pro

References

 
X86 Macintosh computers
Consumer electronics brands